Erin Moran, better known by her stage name, A Girl Called Eddy, is an American soul pop singer/songwriter born in Neptune, New Jersey, U.S. and currently living in England.

Along with Stephen Harris and DJ Sae 1, she was a member of the trip hop act Leomoon who released an eponymous album in 1999.

She is currently signed to Anti Records. She also made an appearance in 2001 on a promotional CD for the Nissan Altima with the track "The Soundtrack of Your Life". In 2001, she released an EP titled, Tears All Over Town on Le Grand Magistery, an independent record label. She started singing background vocals and keyboard playing for Francis Dunnery, a singer-songwriter, providing back-up vocals on his album Man, and toured England. She also toured Europe supporting Josh Ritter.

In August 2004, she released her first, self-titled album in England, working with Richard Hawley.

In 2008, she featured on a free CD with the music magazine Mojo, contributing a version of the Beatles' "Julia" on Mojo Presents the White Album Uncovered CD1.

Moran's influences include Burt Bacharach ("all my life I've been a massive Burt Bacharach fan"), Karen Carpenter, Scott Walker, Carole King, and Paul McCartney.

Moran has been compared with her contemporaries, including Aimee Mann, Beth Orton, and Sarah McLachlan.

In April 2014, The Recoup posted an interview with Erin Moran, where she stated that she was working on a new album.

A record, The Last Detail, with musician Mehdi Zannad, who records as FUGU, was released on November 2, 2018 on Spanish indie label Elefant Records. Moran has stated on Instagram that her second solo record will be released in 2019.

On November 1, 2019 she released a new single  "Been Around" from her first album in 15 years, Been Around, released on January 17, 2020.

Discography

EPs

Tears All Over Town (31 Jul 2001)  Le Grand Magistery. Mastering: Trevor Kampmann 
Pop Matters called it "something quite special". The song "The Soundtrack of Your Life" was used in the US television show Dawson's Creek.
"Heartache" – 3:12  
"The Soundtrack of Your Life" – 3:36
"Girls Can Really Tear You Up Inside" – 5:02
"The Same Old Tears" – 2:47
"Fading..." – 3:48

Somebody Hurt You (14 Jun 2004)  Epitaph 
"Somebody Hurt You" (Radio Edit)" – 3:50
"Love Actually" – 5:10
"Baby Plays Around" – 3:14
"Somebody Hurt You (Album Version)" – 5:07

The Long Goodbye (11 Oct 2004)  Epitaph 
"The Long Goodbye" – 3:27
"Under the Warm Sun" – 3:02
"Heartache" – 4:03

Albums
 Leomoon by Leomoon (1999)
A Girl Called Eddy (2004)    ANTI-
The Last Detail (2018)  Elefant Records
Been Around (2020)  Elefant Records

Many favorable reviews and listed as Top 10 of 2004 by The Wall Street Journal.

References

External links 
Artists page at Anti Records website
 A Girl Called Eddy MySpace Page
Allmusic artist page
last.fm artist page

Year of birth missing (living people)
Living people
21st-century American singers
American women singer-songwriters
American expatriates in England
Singer-songwriters from New Jersey
American women pop singers
American contemporary R&B singers
People from Monmouth County, New Jersey
American soul singers
21st-century American women singers
Anti- (record label) artists